The African rock pipit (Anthus crenatus), also known as the yellow-tufted pipit, is a species of bird in the family Motacillidae. It is found in the high-altitude, rocky grasslands of South Africa and Lesotho.

Taxonomy and Systematics 
The African rock pipit forms a superspecies with the striped pipit.

Description 
The African rock pipit is a uniformly brown pipit with a compact body shape. Its wing coverts have a yellow-green edge. It can be located through its distinctive two-note call.

Ecology 
It feeds on insects, spiders, and occasionally seeds.

References

External links

 African rock pipit - Species text in The Atlas of Southern African Birds.

African rock pipit
African rock pipit
Birds of Southern Africa
African rock pipit
African rock pipit
African rock pipit
Taxonomy articles created by Polbot